Saša Tuksar (born 12 May 1983) is a former professional tennis player from Croatia.

Tuksar made the second round of the Croatia Open in 2003, beating Albert Montañés, who retired hurt after losing the first set. It would be the only match he won on the ATP Tour.

The Croatian played in two French Opens during his career. He lost to 12th seed Nikolay Davydenko in the first round of the 2005 French Open. The following year he returned to Roland Garros and was drawn up against another Russian, Mikhail Youzhny, who beat him in four sets.

He appeared in two Davis Cup ties for the Croatian team. In 2004 he played in Croatia's World Group play-off with Belgium. He took part in a singles rubber, which he lost to Olivier Rochus, although Croatia would go on to win the tie. Two years later, with Argentina and Croatia locked at 2-2 in their World Group quarter-final, Tuksar played the deciding rubber against Juan Ignacio Chela, filling in for Mario Ančić who had a back injury. He lost in four sets.

In September 2010, Tuksar was involved in a traffic accident in which the other passenger, a young tennis player whom Tuksar had coached, sustained fatal injuries. In November 2011, charges were brought against Tuksar at which time he invoked his right to silence.

ATP Challenger and ITF Futures finals

Singles: 5 (1–4)

External links

References

1983 births
Living people
Croatian male tennis players
Sportspeople from Čakovec